Stercorite is the mineral form of microcosmic salt. The name comes from the Latin "stercus", meaning dung, since the mineral was originally discovered among guano.

References

Phosphate minerals
Sodium minerals
Ammonium minerals
Triclinic minerals
Minerals in space group 2